John Stevenson (1843 - 15 August 1912) was a politician in Queensland, Australia. He was a Member of the Queensland Legislative Assembly.

Politics
John Stevenson was elected to the Queensland Legislative Assembly for Clermont  in a by-election on 4 February 1876. He held the seat until the 1878 colonial election.

He was then elected in Normanby on 5 December 1878, which he held until 5 May 1888 (the 1888 election).

He was then elected again in Clermont on 5 May 1888, which he held until 6 May 1893 (the 1893 election).

Stevenson died in Brisbane in 1912 and was buried in South Brisbane Cemetery.

References

Members of the Queensland Legislative Assembly
Burials in South Brisbane Cemetery
1843 births
1912 deaths